Monique Martin (alias Gabrielle Vincent; 9 September 1928 – 24 September 2000) was a Belgian writer and illustrator of children's books. She is most famous for the children's book series Ernest & Celestine.

Biography
Monique Martin was born in Brussels on 9 September 1928, and died there on 24 September 2000. Her nom de plume is derived from the first names of her grandparents, Gabrielle and Vincent.

She worked as a painter of water color before beginning a career in the 1980s as an illustrator with the series Ernest et Célestine, adapted for cinema in 2012.

Works
 Un jour, un chien (1982)
 Brel : 24 portraits (1989)
 Carnet du désert (1992)
 La Petite Marionnette (1992) 
 Lettre à une amie (1993)
 Papouli et Federico - Le Grand Arbre (1994)
 Papouli et Federico - A la mer (1994)
  Papouli et Federico - Dans la forêt (1994)
 Au bonheur des chats (1995) 
 Je voudrais qu'on m'écoute (1995)
 Au bonheur des ours (1995)
 J'ai une lettre pour vous (1995)
 La Montgolfière (1996)
 Nabil (2004)
 Le Violoniste (2006)
 Désordre au paradis (2008)

References

External links
 Site de la Fondation Monique Martin (Gabrielle Vincent)
 Lambiek Comiclopedia biography.

1928 births
2000 deaths
Belgian illustrators
Belgian children's writers
Belgian children's book illustrators
Pseudonymous women writers
Belgian women children's writers
Belgian writers in French
Artists from Brussels
20th-century Belgian women writers
20th-century Belgian writers
Belgian women illustrators
20th-century pseudonymous writers